This is a list of Australian films released in 2004.

2004

See also 

2004 in Australia
 2004 in Australian television
 List of 2004 box office number-one films in Australia

References 

2004
Australian
Films